The following highways are numbered 203:

Canada
 Manitoba Provincial Road 203
 Newfoundland and Labrador Route 203
 Nova Scotia Route 203
 Prince Edward Island Route 203
 Quebec Route 203

Chile
Route 203-CH in Los Ríos Region

China
 China National Highway 203

Costa Rica
 National Route 203

India
  National Highway 203 (India)

Japan
 Japan National Route 203

Belgium
Belgium B203

Thailand
Thailand Route 203

United States
 Alabama State Route 203
 California State Route 203
 Connecticut Route 203
 Georgia State Route 203
 Illinois Route 203
 Indiana State Road 203
 Iowa Highway 203 (former)
 K-203 (Kansas highway)
 Kentucky Route 203
 Maine State Route 203
 Massachusetts Route 203
 M-203 (Michigan highway)
 Montana Secondary Highway 203
 New Mexico State Road 203
 New York State Route 203
 Ohio State Route 203
 Oregon Route 203
 Pennsylvania Route 203 (former)
 South Carolina Highway 203
 South Dakota Highway 203
 Tennessee State Route 203
 Texas State Highway 203
 Texas State Highway Spur 203
 Utah State Route 203
 Virginia State Route 203
 Washington State Route 203
Territories
 Puerto Rico Highway 203